Fathallahabad (also Romanized as Fatḥāllahābād; also known as Kūreh Dasht-e Soflá and Kūrdasht-e Soflá) is a village in Kuhdasht-e Shomali Rural District, in the Central District of Kuhdasht County, Lorestan Province, Iran. At the 2006 census, its population was 444, in 76 families.

References 

Towns and villages in Kuhdasht County